Minium is a genus of thalloid alga.  The thalli take a crustose form.

Species 

The only species currently recognised is M. parvum.

References 

Rhodymeniales
Monotypic algae genera
Red algae genera